The New South Wales Department of Industry was a former department of the New South Wales Government, from 2015 until 2019. The Department of Industry was replaced by the Department of Planning, Industry and Environment in July 2019.

History
The Department of Industry, known as Department of Industry, Skills and Regional Development between 2015 and 2017, was formed on 1 July 2015 following the 2015 state election. The predecessor industry departments of Department of Industry were:
Department of Industry and Investment (2009–2011), branded as Industry & Investment NSW
Department of Trade and Investment, Regional Infrastructure and Services (2011–2015), branded as NSW Trade & Investment
Department of Industry, Skills and Regional Development (2015–2017)

Following the 2019 state election the department was abolished and most of its functions were merged with the Department of Planning and Environment to form the Department of Planning, Industry and Environment, with effect from 1 July 2019. Both the Department of Industry and the Department of Planning and Environment were abolished on the same day.

Structure 
Up until its 2019 abolition, the department was the lead agency in the Industry cluster, led by the secretary, at the time, Simon Draper.

Ministers
The department was responsible to the cluster's five portfolio ministers: at the time of its abolition, the Minister for Skills, and Minister for Small Business, the Hon John Barilaro MP who also served as the deputy premier; the Minister for Primary Industries, Minister for Regional Water, and Minister for Trade and Industry, the Hon Niall Blair MLC who also served as the coordinating minister of the industry cluster; the Minister for Lands and Forestry, and Minister for Racing, the Hon Paul Toole MP; the Minister for Sport, the Hon Stuart Ayres MP; the Minister for Tourism and Major Events, and Assistant Minister for Skills, the Hon Adam Marshall MP. All ministers were ultimately responsible to the Parliament of New South Wales.

Operational divisions
The department had four operational areas delivering to the citizens of NSW and a single central division—Corporate Service Partners—providing departmental services and coordination across operational and strategic functions. 

The four operational divisions were:

 Skills and Economic Development
 NSW Department of Primary Industries
 Liquor, Gaming and Racing
 Lands and Water.

Also, the NSW chief scientist and engineer, the NSW small business commissioner, the land & water commissioner, and the chief audit executive reported directly to the secretary.

Priorities
The department's corporate plan 2015–19 set out its direction and focus. It articulated the department's vision, purpose and values, and was driven by seven strategic priorities: 

 sustaining the conditions for economic development
 innovation in primary industries to improve resilience and boost productivity
 support to increase jobs and investment in NSW
 skills development programs for employment
 sustainable use and access to natural resources
 risks managed for natural resources, farming and food
 foster a vibrant and valued sport and active recreation sector.

The department's corporate plan underpinned the delivery of the NSW State Priorities.

Agencies
The Department of Industry was the lead agency in the NSW Industry Cluster, which, up until its 2019 abolition, included the following agencies, state-owned corporations and statutory bodies: 

 Executive agencies: Local Land Services, Destination NSW, Office of Sport, and the NSW Institute of Sport
 State-owned corporations: Forestry Corporation of NSW, and WaterNSW. 
 Cemeteries & Crematoria NSW
 Combat Sports Authority of NSW
 Dams Safety Committee
 Dumaresq–Barwon Border Rivers Commission
 Fisheries Scientific Committee
 Greyhound Racing NSW
 Greyhound Welfare & Integrity Commission
 Harness Racing NSW
 Independent Liquor & Gaming Authority
 Innovation and Productivity Council
 Marine Estate Management Authority
 NSW Rural Assistance Authority
 NSW Skills Board
 Racing NSW
 Regional Sporting Venues Authority
 Rice Marketing Board
 Snowy Scientific Committee
 State Sporting Venues Authority
 Sydney Cricket Ground and Sports Trust
 Sydney Olympic Park Authority
 TAFE Commission
 Venues NSW
 Veterinary Practitioners Board
 Wild Dog Destruction Board
 Wine Grapes Marketing Board

References

External links
 NSW Department of Industry (www.industry.nsw.gov.au) webpage
 NSW Department of Primary Industries (www.dpi.nsw.gov.au) webpage 
 NSW Government websites aligned with the department and its related authorities, boards, institutions and corporations (www.industry.nsw.gov.au/about/our-business/our-publications-and-websites/websites)

Industry
Economy of New South Wales
2015 establishments in Australia
2019 disestablishments in Australia
Government agencies disestablished in 2019
Government agencies established in 2015